The Survivalist is the generic title of Jerry Ahern's long-lived series of 29 pulp novels centering around John Rourke, an ex-CIA officer turned weapons and survival expert, in the aftermath of a nuclear war.

Background

Ahern produced twenty-seven novels in numbered sequence, plus two un-numbered novels which fit between 15/16 and 21/22, selling 3.5 million copies in total.

The first few books cover Rourke's attempts to find his family, on the way fighting invading Soviet troops as well as typical post-apocalyptic villains such as biker gangs, mutants and cannibals in extended scenes of graphic violence. Later books head more into science fiction with cryonics, doomsday weapons and underwater cities.

Starting in 2007, audio versions started to be released by Graphic Audio covering the entire series of novels. The last book released in 2011.

The series was long out of print, until the continuation of the series in The Inheritors of Earth which was released June 2013.  However e-book versions of the entire series are available.

Some of the books were translated into Polish. Also a French publisher (see below) extended the series.. The Finnish translations were titled as ”Voittaja” (meaning "the Winner") series. However the original ”Survivalist” logo was included as well on the Finnish version covers.

Major characters

John Thomas Rourke

Doctor, survival and weapons expert, and ex-CIA paramilitary operations officer. He has keen sight, but is consequently sensitive to bright light and is usually wearing sunglasses, even at night. He is always armed with a pair of Detonics Combat Master .45 pistols in Alessi shoulder holsters, Colt Python and Colt Lawman revolvers, an A.G. Russell Sting 1A boot knife, and a shoulder sling with either a CAR-15 assault rifle or a Steyr-Mannlicher SSG sniper rifle.

Sarah Rourke

Rourke's wife (later wife of Col. Wolfgang Mann) Children's Author and Illustrator before the war. She carries a stock Government M1911.45 while fleeing the Soviets with her children. The weapon becomes rust pitted and badly maintained because of her limited understanding of guns. Later she is gifted a custom .45 with "Trapper Gun" etched on the slide. It was based on a Colt Combat Commander, similar in size to Rourke's Detonics pistols. Sarah also utilizes different M16's throughout the series.

Michael Rourke

John and Sarah Rourke's son. Natalia Tiemerovna's lover and husband. Michael Rourke adopts 2 single action .44 Magnums in his 5-year tutorage (along with Annie) by Rourke while the rest of the family cryogenically sleep. Realising they are to slow to load in a combat situation he acquires two Beretta 92SBF's from Eden stores. Carries them in a double shoulder holster rig like his father. He also receives a Crain Life Support System I knife replica, a gift from an Icelandic knife maker.

Annie Rourke

John and Sarah Rourke's daughter. Paul Rubenstein's eventual wife.

Paul Rubenstein

John Rourke's sidekick, fellow survivor of the Albuquerque airliner crash on the night of the war. Fond of his looted Browning Hi-Power 9 mm pistol and vintage WW II "Schmeisser" MP-40 submachine gun. Wields a Gerber Mk II fighting knife later in the series given to him by Rourke.

Major Natalia Tiemerovna
Adopted surreptitiously as a niece by General Varakov, after her real parents were killed by the KGB. After her surrogate parents died in a road accident, Natalia trained as a KGB agent, reaching the rank of major by the beginning of the war. Married to the unpredictable and often exceedingly ruthless Vladimir Karamatzov—the head of the KGB in the U.S.—whom she eventually left after being beaten and otherwise mistreated—she developed a close relationship with Rourke. Tiemerovna's favorite weapons include a suppressed Walther pistol, an M16 and a butterfly knife.
Don't forget those sequential serial number,L-frame Smith & Wesson revolvers, presented to her by a US President, with four inch barrels. She wore them in a double hip rig that I seem to remember she had to find a shorter belt because of her slim waist. They were two S&W model 686, S&W answer to the Colt Python decades too late.

General Ishmael Varakov

Natalia's uncle, and leader of the Soviet occupation forces in the U.S., Varakov many times shows himself to be a patriotic, honorable and reasonable Soviet soldier, who at times helps Rourke to stop some of the more extreme plans of the KGB. Varakov  is at his best when he spews withering insults upon one of his country's intelligence assets who has survived to become a person of importance in the remnants of the U.S. federal government. Varakov tells this spy (controlled by blackmail due to his pedophilia) that if the spy makes the slightest error for any reason, Varakov will reveal him to the Americans. On the other hand, if the spy ever harms another child and Varakov learns of it, Varakov warns that he will kill the spy by hand. Eventually, Rourke holds the injured spy at gunpoint and promises him morphine in exchange for the means to radio Varakov, but rather than doing as he said, Rourke shoots the spy dead for his misdeeds.

Vladimir Karamatsov

Nemesis of Rourke, husband of Natalia Tiemerovna, head of the North American branch of the KGB. Rourke shot Karamatsov at General Varakov's request, since it was politically impossible for Varakov himself to take revenge for the mistreatment of Natalia. Karmatsov somehow survived Rourke's attack, but was later killed by Natalia herself.

Colonel Nehemiah Rozhdestvenskiy

Head of the KGB after Karamatzov's death. So power-crazed he even shoots down an airliner carrying the surviving members of the Soviet Politburo to the U.S.

Plot overview

Soviet Army troops cross the Khyber Pass from Afghanistan into Pakistan.  John Rourke is conducting classes in Pakistan and witnesses the invasion.  Rourke then attempts to return home to the United States.

The Soviet leaders launch a nuclear strike against the U.S. and the U.S. president retaliates in kind. Nearly two hundred million Americans and over a hundred million Soviets are killed in the ensuing nuclear exchange, and tsunamis hit both California and New York. Rourke is on a Boeing 747 bound for Georgia when the missiles hit, and the pilots are blinded by the explosions. Rourke manages to crash-land the plane near Albuquerque, New Mexico and teams up with Paul Rubenstein, another survivor of the crash.

With Soviet airborne forces landing on U.S. soil, and almost every other major U.S. politician dead, the U.S. president commits suicide to prevent a forced surrender. Rourke's family become refugees after a gang of looters attack their farm.

Searching for a NASA astronaut who knows about a mysterious "Eden Project", Rourke enters Soviet-occupied Athens, Georgia, and is captured. Varakov has a job for him: Rourke is to kill Karamatzov, who has beaten Natalia on suspicion of adultery with Rourke.

A National Guard officer joins forces with a cult of wild-men to infiltrate a remaining missile silo and use the missiles to destroy Chicago. While Rourke's family fight with the resistance and the Soviets experiment with cryonic suspension, Rourke and Natalia fight the wild-men to save the city.

Rourke finally finds his family in Tennessee, and takes them to his survival retreat. To save themselves from war-induced climate change (specifically, the ionization of the atmosphere due to unexplained side effects of the nuclear exchange), the KGB loot Eden Project cryonics research from the Johnson Space Center, while Rourke and Natalia fight through Soviet troops, feral dogs, and cannibals to discuss the coming 'end of the world' with Varakov in Chicago.

Rourke and Natalia break into 'The Womb', a Soviet survival habitat in what used to be NORAD, to prevent the KGB from destroying the Eden Project shuttles on their return to Earth. The two take cryonics equipment allowing the Rourkes, Paul, and Natalia to survive the impending climatic catastrophe. Almost all life on the Earth's surface is wiped out, with Varakov dying in Chicago. Rozhdestvenskiy, searching for Rourke in Georgia, dies in a climactic shootout with him, even as the world's atmosphere ignites above them.

Having planned a five hundred year cryogenic sleep to await the returning Eden Project shuttles, Rourke awakens Annie and Michael early, raising them until their late teens. He then returns himself to cryogenic suspension so they'll be adults by the time that he and the others awaken. Michael explores the post-apocalypse world, finding tribes of cannibals surrounding a pre-war fallout shelter where the occupants rigorously maintain a limited population, sending excess workers outside to die.

The Eden Project (an international project) returns and lands in Georgia at a makeshift runway created by the Rourkes and they form a colony there. The Soviet Union has survived in massive underground shelters and continues their conflict with the Rourke family across the globe. Nazi Germany also survived in an underground shelter in South America but the Nazi regime is overthrown through the efforts of Rourke and his family. The now democratic German colony become staunch allies of Rourke. Iceland's inhabitants survived in hollow volcanoes and join the Rourke family in their battles. A particularly dramatic book, Mid-Wake, details how the United States survived in an underwater colony in the Pacific. A Soviet colony nearby also survived and both colonies have continued the war over the last five centuries. The Chinese survived in three underground cities and become involved in battles as well. The books end with an alliance of the freedom-loving states defeating the evil regime states and peace returning to the Earth.

Weapons and equipment details
Ahern is very meticulous in his description of the weapons and equipment used by characters in the story, particularly with regard to his hero's preferences. So, for instance, John Thomas Rourke does not carry a .357 Magnum as his backup gun, he carries a Colt Python .357 Magnum revolver customized by Mag-na-port and Metalife, firing Federal Premium jacketed hollowpoint ammunition.

Such detail regarding the brands and specific products endorsed by Rourke extends to all sorts of items that appear in the series. This list is representative, but by no means complete. John Thomas Rourke favors:

Steyr-Mannlicher SSG rifle
Colt CAR-15 assault rifle
twin stainless steel Detonics .45 handguns
Colt Python revolver
Colt Lawman .357 snub nose revolver 
Colt Government Mark IV .45
Alessi shoulder rig
Ranger leather holsters 
Pachmayr handgun grips
Custom recoil suppression by Mag-na-port
Firearms refinishing by Metalife Industries
Safariland speedloaders
Jack Crain LSS survival knife
Chris Miller Bowie knife
AG Russell Sting IA boot knife
M16 bayonet
Lowe Alpine Loco Pack backpack
Kel-Lite flashlight
Bushnell Corporation 8x30 armoured binoculars 
Aviator sunglasses 
Zippo cigarette lighters
Black-faced Rolex Sub-mariner wristwatch
Coleman camp stoves and lanterns
Mountain House freeze-dried meals
Harley-Davidson motorcycles

Books

 No.1 Total War (1981) 
 No.2 The Nightmare Begins (1981) 
 No.3 The Quest (1981) 
 No.4 The Doomsayer (1981) 
 No.5 The Web (1983) 
 No.6 The Savage Horde (1983) 
 No.7 The Prophet (1984) 
 No.8 The End is Coming (1984) 
 No.9 Earth Fire (1984) 
 No.10 The Awakening (1984) 
 No.11 The Reprisal (1985) 
 No.12 The Rebellion (1985) 
 No.13 Pursuit (1986) 
 No.14 The Terror (1987) 
 No.15 Overlord (1987) 
 Mid-Wake (1988) 
 No.16 The Arsenal (1988) 
 No.17 The Ordeal (1988) 
 No.18 The Struggle (1989) 
 No.19 Final Rain (1989) 
 No.20 Firestorm (1989) 
 No.21 ...To End all War (1990) 
 The Legend (1991) 
 No.22 Brutal Conquest (1991) 
 No.23 Call to Battle (1992) 
 No.24 Blood Assassins (1992) 
 No.25 War Mountain (1993) 
 No.26 Countdown (1993) 
 No.27 Death Watch (1993) 
 No.28 "Mid-Wake"
 No.29 "The Legend"
 No.30 "The Inheritors of Earth (2013) with Bob Anderson 
 No.31 "Earth Shine" (2013) with Bob Anderson
 No.32 "The Quisling Covenant" (2014) with Bob Anderson
 No.33 "Deep Star" (2015) with Bob Anderson
 No.34 "Lodestar" (2016) with Bob Anderson
 No.35 "Blood Moon" (2018) with Bob Anderson
 No.36 "Operation Phoenix" (2019) with Bob Anderson

French novels

A French publisher produced at least 51 books based on The Survivalist. The first 7 match the English titles fairly well so could be translations, the rest are different.

Published by Vaugirard.
Text for 31 and 51 (and the rest?) by Frederic Charpier (possibly a pseudonym used by multiple authors). 31 and 51 published in 1990 and 1993 respectively. Www.Chapitre.Com has listed copies for sale in the past.

01 Guerre totale Total war
02 Le Cauchemar commence The nightmare begins
03 L'escadrom de fer Iron
squadron
04 Le cri de l'epervier Cry of the
sparrow-hawk
05 Le piege The trap
06 Les hommes-jaguars The
jaguar men
07 Le prophete The prophet
 (Judging by
the titles, 1-7 may be translations of the
originals)

08 Kamikazes Kamikazes
09 Enfer cannibale
Cannibal hell
10 Pulsions de mort Pulses(?) of
death
11 Terreur sous Manhattan Terror under
Manhattan
12 Les damnees The damned
13 Sierra commando
Sierra commando
14 Assaut Assault
15 La nuit des
saboteurs Night of the saboteurs
16 Haute trahison High
treason
17 La traque sauvage The savage hunt
18 Les
maitres de guerre The masters of war
19 La balade des tortionnaires Torturers'(?) run
20 Massacre en eaux
troubles Massacre in troubled waters
21 Carnage sous
les tropiques Carnage under the tropics
22
Nuit barbare Barbarous night
23 Apocalypse Bay
Apocalypse Bay
24 Le tueur du desert Desert killer
25
Les chiens du diable Dogs of the devil
26 Les
rebelles The rebels
27 Les hommes du Klan Men of the
Klan
28 Reglement de compte a Fayetteville Settlement
of account at Fayetteville
29 Freres de sang
Blood brothers
30 Noces macabres en Georgie Macabre weddings in Georgia
31 Raid sur Royal Oak Raid
on Royal Oak
32 La brigade infernale The infernal
brigade
33 La chasse au sorcier Hunt for the sorcerer
34
Passeport pour Hooligan City Passport for Hooligan
City
35 La vallee des morts The valley of deaths
36
Les bateliers de la riviere rouge Boatmen of red
river
37 La vengeance Vengeance
38 Mission speciale
Special mission
39 Le squelette de verre Skeleton of
glass
40 Les nouveaux seigneurs du Mississippi New
lords of the Mississippi
41 Saint Louis gang St.
Louis gang
42 Le rescape du 3rd Reich Survivor
of the 3rd Reich
43 La croisade des
christeros Crusade of the Christeros
44 La crypte des
supplices The crypt of agonies
45 La griffe du vampire
The claw of the vampire
46 Mortel guet-apens
Deadly ambush
47 Missouri, etat d'alerte Missouri, state of alert
48 Les coupeurs de tetes
Head-hunters
49 Les possedes de Brettwood The maniacs of Brettwood
50 Le contrat du diable Devil's contract
51 Terre, pointe zero Ground zero

Footnotes

Sources

Other than the books themselves:
 Nuclear Holocausts Bibliography 
 The Survivalist Series

External links
NUKE POP - Popular culture of the nuclear age.
Radioactive Rambos  - Examples of survivalist fiction in general.
Mackbolan.com - Features synopsis of all of the Survivalist books as well as the ability to review and read reviews of each book in the series.
Graphic Audio - Starting in 2007, Graphic Audio slowly converted The Survivalist into audio book format, complete with sound effects, different voices. The final book was released in February 2011.

Science fiction novel series
Post-apocalyptic novels
Novels about survival skills